Tour of the Mongoose (also known as El Tour de la Mangosta  in hispanophone countries) is the third concert tour by Colombian singer and songwriter, Shakira, in support of her fifth studio album and first English album, Laundry Service (2001). It was the singer's first global tour, reaching North America, South America and Europe. The tour grossed close to $72 million according to Sony Music.

Background
Clear Channel Entertainment announced the Tour of the Mongoose in September 2002. The tour came shortly after Shakira reached international success with her third studio album. During a press conference in New York City, Shakira summarized her show as an "entertaining rock show", stating, "I'm not saving any effort to make sure that this concert [tour] will be the best I can offer to my fans. And it's going to have a strong spirit of rock and roll, so you will see a rock-and-roll show, but it will have all of the nuances and the subtleties of a show that attempts to entertain".

At the same press conference, Shakira explained the tour's name as symbolizing the strength of the mongoose, stating "...I was really impressed by it because it is an animal that can defeat the snake with just a bite. It's like a living miracle, this animal, to me, because if there's an animal on earth that can defeat the snake—a venomous viper—with a bite, I think that there's got to be some way for us to defeat, or to bite the neck of hatred in this world, no? "It's called the Tour of the Mongoose, and the mongoose is basically one of the few animals who can defeat the most venomous snakes with just one bite and that's why I decided to name my tour that way, because I think that if we all have a little mongoose inside that can defeat the hatred and the resentment and the prejudice of everyday, we can probably win the battle." At the tour commencement, Corey Moss of MTV compared the singer to Britney Spears, Tommy Lee, Elvis Presley, Sheryl Crow and Rage Against the Machine.

Controversy

The show sparked some controversy due to a perceived anti-war message in a video played prior to the performance of "Octavo Día", displaying war footage and later revealing the Grim Reaper to be a puppeteer. Shakira defended the video, stating,

Commercial performance
Shakira became the first Latin female artist to perform at Argentina's Estadio Monumental Antonio Vespucio Liberti (River Plate stadium), the sold out show had over 60,000 people in attendance. The concert in Santiago, Chile broke Luis Miguel's record of most expensive concert tickets in the country due to Shakira's huge global popularity and high demand. The show in Atlantic Pavilion, Lisbon has attracted 19,136 people which has broken attendance record holding by American rock trio R.E.M. 
The tour was also going to be visiting the continent of Asia with stops planned such as: Tokyo, Hong Kong, Taipei, Manila, Singapore, Bangkok, Sydney and Melbourne, but this wasn't able to happen due to the 2002-2004 SARS outbreak at the time.

Broadcast and recordings

The tour was shot in Rotterdam, The Netherlands on April 22, 2003. The tour was chronicled on Live & off the Record. The disc included selected songs from the concert, along with a documentary showing the performer preparing for the show, her song writing process and her ideas about social responsibility. It also includes a live CD that features ten songs that were performed during the show. The CD spun off two singles, "Poem to a Horse" and "Whenever, Wherever Live". In a special edition of Fijación Oral, Volume 1 the performances of "Fool" and "Dónde Están los Ladrones?" were included.

Setlist
{{hidden
| headercss = background: #ccccff; font-size: 100%; width: 60%;
| contentcss = text-align: left; font-size: 100%; width: 60%;
| header = Anglophone
| content =
"Ojos Así"
"Si Te Vas"
"Fool"
"Ciega, Sordomuda"
"The One"
"Dude (Looks Like A Lady)" (contains elements of "Te Dejo Madrid")
"Back In Black"
"Rules"
"Inevitable" 
"Underneath Your Clothes"
"Estoy Aquí" 
"Octavo Día"
"Ready For The Good Times"
"Un Poco de Amor" 
"Poem to a Horse" 
"Tú"
Encore
"Objection (Tango)" (Afro-Punk Version)
"Whenever, Wherever" (Sahara Mix)
}}

{{hidden
| headercss = background: #ccccff; font-size: 100%; width: 60%;
| contentcss = text-align: left; font-size: 100%; width: 60%;
| header = Hispanophone
| content =
 "Ojos Así"
 "Si Te Vas"
 "Ciega, Sordomuda"
 "Inevitable"
 "Dude (Looks Like A Lady)" (contains elements of "Te Dejo Madrid")
 "Back In Black"
 "Rules"
"Underneath Your Clothes"
 "Estoy Aquí" 
 "Octavo Día"
 "Ready For The Good Times"
 "Un Poco De Amor"
 "¿Dónde Están Los Ladrones?"
 "Tú"
 "Te Dejo Madrid"
Encore
"Te Aviso, Te Anuncio (Tango)" (Afro-Punk Version)
"Suerte"(contains elements of "Whenever, Wherever (Sahara Mix)")
}}

Tour dates

Billboard Box office score data

Personnel
 Shakira – Producer, songwriter, vocals, guitar, harmonica
 Gonzalo Agulla – Executive producer
 José Arnal – Executive producer
 Tim Mitchell – Producer, arranger, guitar
 Dana Austin – Producer
 Bettina Abascal – Post producer
 Dominic Morley – Engineer
 Richard Robson – Engineer
 Neil Tucker – Engineer
 Matt Vaughan – Engineer
 Richard Wilkinson – Engineer
 Adrian Hall – Mixing engineer
 Chris Theis – Mixing engineer
 Mike Fisher – Audio post-production
 Mike Wilder – Mastering
 Ramiro Aguilar – Video director
 Pablo Arraya – Editing assistant
 Rita Quintero – Backing vocals, keyboards
 Adam Zimmon – Guitar
 Mario Inchaust – Backing vocals, Guitars
 Albert Sterling Menendez – Keyboards
 Pedro Alfonso – Violin
 Dan Rothchild – Bass guitar, photography
 Brendan Buckley – Drums
 Rafael Padilla – Percussion
 Jeff Bender – Photography, cover photo
 Frank Ockenfels – Photography
 Ian Cuttler – Art direction
 Frank Carbonari – Graphic design
 Rose Noone – A&R

References

External links

 Shakira's Official Website

Shakira concert tours
2002 concert tours
2003 concert tours